Azeez Al-Shaair (born August 4, 1997) is an American football outside linebacker for the Tennessee Titans of the National Football League (NFL). He played college football at Florida Atlantic.

Early life and high school
Al-Shaair was born in Tampa, Florida and moved back and forth between Tampa and Saudi Arabia, where his father worked as an English instructor, as a young child until his parents divorced. He lived in Section 8 and became homeless as a sophomore in high school after his home burned down. He commuted two hours by bus from a motel to Hillsborough High School, where he played football. As a senior, he made 126 tackles with 6.5 sacks, two interceptions, three forced fumbles and three fumble recoveries and also blocked six field goals and a blocked punt and was named first-team All-County. Al-Shaair committed to play college football at Florida Atlantic University going into his senior year, but continued to go on recruiting visits in order to help feed his family.

College career
Al-Shaair was a four year starter at linebacker for the Florida Atlantic Owls. As a freshman, Al-Shaair was named to the Conference USA All-Freshman team and named a Freshman All-American after recording a team-leading 94 tackles (7.5 for loss), 1.5 sacks, two passes broken up and a forced fumble. He again led the Owls in tackles as a sophomore with 113 (12 for loss) and returned an interception for a touchdown and was named honorable mention All-Conference USA. As a junior, Al-Shaair led Conference USA with 147 tackles (11 for loss) along with 2.5 sacks, four passes defensed and a forced fumble and was named first-team all conference. He entered his senior year on the Butkus Award watchlist but tore his ACL in an October practice, ending his final season after six games.

Professional career

2019
Al-Shaair was signed by the San Francisco 49ers as an undrafted free agent on April 27, 2019. Al-Shaair made his NFL debut in the season-opener against the Tampa Bay Buccaneers, playing exclusively on special teams and making two tackles in the 31-17 road victory. The 49ers reached Super Bowl LIV, but lost to the Kansas City Chiefs by a score of 31–20. He did not appear in any postseason games. Al-Shaair played in 15 games with four starts as a rookie, making 18 tackles.

2020
In Week 4 against the Philadelphia Eagles on Sunday Night Football, Al-Shaair recorded his first career interception off a pass thrown by Carson Wentz during the 25–20 loss.

2021
Al-Shaair entered the 2021 season as a starting linebacker for the 49ers. He started 13 games, finishing second on the team with 102 tackles, along with two sacks, five passes defensed, an interception, a forced fumble and two fumble recoveries.

2022
On March 15, 2022, the 49ers placed a second-round restricted free agent tender on Al-Shaair. He was placed on injured reserve on October 3, 2022. He was activated on November 12.

Personal
Al-Shaair is a practicing Muslim and fasts during Ramadan, including when he was participating in FAU's summer practices.

References

External links
FAU Owls bio
San Francisco 49ers bio

African-American Muslims
American Muslims
1997 births
Living people
Players of American football from Tampa, Florida
American football linebackers
San Francisco 49ers players
Florida Atlantic Owls football players